The Mask from Provadia is a Chalcolithic artifact that was found at the Provadia-Saltworks archeological site.

The mask has no mouth and features a stylized nose and elliptical eyes. There are small holes on the artifact that are believed to have been used to hang up or wear the artifact. 

The artifact is one of many others found at the site. The area also includes a mass grave and salt extraction facilities.

Ancient cities of the Balkans
Archaeological sites in Bulgaria
History of Varna Province
Destroyed towns
Geography of Varna Province
Prehistoric sites in Bulgaria

References